David Cavazos (born April 19, 1985, in Monterrey, Nuevo León) is a Mexican singer-songwriter.

David Cavazos began composing music at the age of eighteen and later signed with Warner Music Mexico, music label in which he found the support he needed to begin a solo career. He recorded his self-titled debut album in 2007 and released it on May 13, 2008, in Mexico. Cavazos' first single Bruja Hada became one of the most requested songs on Mexican radio.

External links
 Official Website

References

1987 births
Singers from Monterrey
Living people
21st-century Mexican singers
21st-century Mexican male singers